Slackia is a genus of Actinomycetota, in the family Coriobacteriaceae. Slackia is named after the microbiologist Geoffrey Slack.

References

External links
 LPSN

Coriobacteriaceae
Bacterial vaginosis
Bacteria genera